James Downing (born January 4, 1942) is an American former professional race car driver, he is a five-time IMSA Championship winner, owner/driver of Downing/Atlanta Racing, and was principal in the development of the HANS device.

Personal life

Downing was born in Atlanta, Georgia, and is a Georgia Tech graduate with a degree in industrial management.  He married public relations specialist Connie Goudinoff in 1989. He is a member of the Phi Gamma Delta (FIJI) fraternity.

Racing 

His father was a major foreign car dealer in the Atlanta area, he grew up around cars and racing.  He began racing soapbox derbies when he was 11, raced those for several years, then won a local downhill slalom event when he was 16.  In his late teens and early twenties, he raced gymkhanas (known today as SCCA Solo) in almost anything he could get his hands on because SCCA rules of the time prohibited racing before age 21.  When he was 21, he bought an Elva Courier for $200 that had been totaled, spent a year and a half putting it back together, and began racing at Daytona Beach in 1963.  He continued SCCA racing successfully on the amateur level for the next 11 years.

Looking for new challenges, he joined IMSA in 1974, at the invitation of John Bishop, President, and founder of the (then) new International Motor Sports Association (IMSA), they were so friendly and helpful that it convinced him that he should give it a try.  As a young person coming out of very amateur racing, it was a big step.  He quickly discovered in the first year of racing a Mazda RX-2 in the old RS series that he got more experience in one year than he had in the last six years in club racing.

Sponsored by the Mazda factory for his entire IMSA career, Jim progressed up the competition ladder from the near showroom stock Radial Sedan series Mazda RX-2 & Mazda RX3, to GTU Mazda RX3 & Mazda RX7 and GTO in the Mazda RX7, then up to the ultra-quick purpose-built GTP category prototypes, all powered by two, three, and four-rotor versions of the Mazda Wankel engine.  After competing in an Argo-built prototype since 1984, in 1988 he began designing and building a prototype racer of his own design.  His Kudzu DG-1, made its debut in San Antonio in September 1989.

In 1999, with the demise/reorganization of the IMSA series, he moved on to the American Le Mans Series with his Kudzu racers until the end of the 2000 racing season, then into an AutoExe Motorsports prototype as his long and successful career wound down.

During his illustrious forty-five-year racing career he has either won or scored highly in races at Daytona, Sebring, Nürburgring and Le Mans.  He won several Camel Lights championships, including 41 career victories, and is still racing today in SCCA and Formula Atlantic (the fastest class in SCCA).

HANS Device 
Jim Downing has been credited as the first to identify the problems associated with a restrained torso and an unrestrained head in sudden deceleration impacts, following the 1981 death of Patrick Jacquemart at the Mid-Ohio Sports Car Course during the Red Roof Inns 200 IMSA GT Championship event in May 1981.  Jacquemart, the director of Renault Racing in the United States, was at the wheel of his IMSA GTU-specification Renault 5 Turbo when he missed the curve at the bottom of the plunge down Thunder Valley (Turn 7), striking a sandbank with the front of the car. He suffered a fracture of the base of his skull and was pronounced dead on arrival at Morrow County Hospital in Mount Gilead, OH.

With the problem identified, Downing turned to his brother-in-law, Dr. Robert Hubbard, a bio mechanical crash engineer for General Motors, to help him design a Head And Neck Support system that would eliminate or protect against these types of injuries.  Working together, their goal was to create a device that would reduce the chance of a serious injury caused by the violent movement of the unrestrained head and helmet during a crash.  Dr. Hubbard created the first prototypes of the HANS Device in the late 1980s, and Downing, as a firm believer of the product he had helped to create, started wearing the untested prototype of the HANS Device during his IMSA sports car races.

Racing record

SCCA National Championship Runoffs

Notable Motorsports Awards 

2002 Phil Hill Award

2008 Bob Akin Memorial Motorsports Award

2012 Sebring Hall of Fame Inductee

2014 SCCA Hall of Fame Inductee

References 

Internet Source:  Road Racing Drivers Club

Internet Source:  Mulsanne's Corner:  An Interview With Jim Downing

RRDC Press Release, dated February 4, 2008:   Motorsport.com

External links 
Downing/Atlanta

Living people
1942 births
International Motor Sports Association
24 Hours of Daytona drivers
Georgia Tech alumni
Racing drivers from Atlanta
SCCA National Championship Runoffs participants